Osmoy may refer to the following places in France:

Osmoy, Cher, a commune in the department of Cher
Osmoy, Yvelines, a commune in the department of Yvelines
Osmoy-Saint-Valery, a commune in the department of Seine-Maritime